Mercedes-Benz has sold a number of automobiles with the "280" model name:
 1959–1968 W111
 1967–1971 280SE Coupe & Cabrio
 1969–1971 280SE 3.5 Coupe & Cabrio
 1968–1971 W113
 1968–1971 280SL
 1968–1973 W108
 1968–1972 280SEL
 1968–1972 280SE
 1969–1971 280S
 1971–1973 280SEL 3.5 (& 4.5 - North America only)
 1971–1973 280SE 3.5 (& 4.5 - North America only)
 1972–1976 W114
 1972–1976 280
 1973–1976 280C + 280CE
 1975–1980 W116
 1975–1976 280S
 1977–1980 280SE + SEL
 1977–1981 W123
 1977–1981 280E
 1975/12–1986/01 W123
 1975/12–1981/07 280
 1975/12–1985/12 280E
 1977/04–1980/03 280C
 1977/04–1985/08 280CE
 1978/05–1986/01 280TE
 1994 W202
 1994 C280

280